Luther Palmer (born July 20, 1949) is a former American football player and coach. He served as the head football coach at Virginia University of Lynchburg in 2013. He was drafted by the Los Angeles Rams in 17th round of the 1972 NFL Draft.

References

1949 births
Living people
American football placekickers
American football tight ends
Chicago Fire (WFL) players
Florida Blazers players
San Antonio Wings players
Virginia–Lynchburg Dragons football coaches
Virginia Union Panthers football players
People from Chambersburg, Pennsylvania
Players of American football from Pennsylvania